Pomo may refer to:
One of the Pomo languages of California
A dialect of the Pol language of Cameroon